South Korea's Ministry of Justice (MOJ) is a cabinet-level ministry overseeing justice affairs, headed by the Minister of Justice. It is responsible for supervising South Korea prosecution service, legal affairs, immigration control, correction service, crime prevention and protection of human rights.

Its headquarters are located in Building #1 of the Gwacheon Government Complex in Gwacheon, Gyeonggi Province.

Established on July 17, 1948, the Ministry of Justice is the only ministry whose name has never been changed or altered in the history of the Republic of Korea.

Agencies
 Supreme Prosecutors' Office of the Republic of Korea
 Korea Correctional Service

List of Ministers of Justice

See also

 Justice ministry
 Politics of South Korea

References

External links
 Ministry of Justice (Korean)
 Ministry of Justice (English)

Government ministries of South Korea
South Korea
Ministries established in 1948
1948 establishments in South Korea